Lawrence Lucchino (born September 6, 1945) is an American lawyer, best known as an executive in Major League Baseball (MLB). He previously served as president of the Baltimore Orioles, president/CEO of the San Diego Padres, and president/CEO of the Boston Red Sox. He is chairman of the Worcester Red Sox, the Triple-A affiliate of the Boston Red Sox; chairman of The Jimmy Fund, the philanthropic arm of the Dana–Farber Cancer Institute; and president/CEO emeritus of Fenway Sports Group, the parent company of the Boston Red Sox and Liverpool F.C. Lucchino played college basketball for the Princeton Tigers.

Early life
Lucchino was born in Pittsburgh, graduated from Taylor Allderdice High School there, and attended Princeton University where he played college basketball. He was a member of the Princeton Tigers men's basketball team for the 1964–65, 1965–66, and 1966–67 seasons. The 1964–65 Tigers, captained by Bill Bradley, advanced to the Final Four of the 1965 NCAA University Division basketball tournament.

Lucchino graduated from Princeton in 1967 and then received a J.D. degree from Yale Law School, where he was a classmate of Hillary Clinton.

Career
After law school, Lucchino practiced law with the Washington, D. C., law firm of Williams & Connolly. The founder, famed litigator Edward Bennett Williams, had ownership interest in both the Washington Redskins and the Baltimore Orioles. Lucchino's law practice at Williams & Connolly included a substantial amount of work for those two sports teams. Through that work, Lucchino served on the Redskins' board of directors from 1979 to 1985. He later became president of the Baltimore Orioles, serving from 1988 to 1993, and president and CEO of the San Diego Padres, serving from 1995 to 2001. Lucchino subsequently joined the Boston Red Sox as president and CEO when John W. Henry purchased the team in December 2001.

Lucchino is known for having initiated the trend of building baseball-only facilities with an old-fashioned charm and smaller seating capacities. Under his watch, both the Orioles and Padres built new stadiums, pioneering Oriole Park at Camden Yards and Petco Park, respectively. Various other MLB teams have followed this lead and built new stadiums with an old-style look and feel.

Lucchino helped build Padres teams that made the playoffs in 1996 and 1998. They advanced to the 1998 World Series, which was instrumental in winning a city-wide vote in November 1998 to authorize the construction of Petco Park. Lucchino was named to the Padres Hall of Fame in 2022.

Lucchino brought future general manager Theo Epstein with him to the Red Sox from the Orioles and the Padres, having also encouraged Epstein to attend law school while he was working at the Padres. As part of the management team that signed David Ortiz to the Red Sox, Lucchino "always enjoyed a strong connection with Big Papi throughout his entire career".

On August 1, 2015, the Red Sox announced that Lucchino was stepping down after the 2015 season. He retired on October 5, 2015, and became president/CEO emeritus of Fenway Sports Group. Lucchino continued as chairman and co-owner of the Pawtucket, Rhode Island-based Pawtucket Red Sox. He was a key figure in the relocation of the franchise to Worcester, Massachusetts, becoming the Worcester Red Sox for the 2021 minor league season. Lucchino serves as that team's first chairman.

Personal life

Lucchino previously served on the board of directors for Special Olympics. He has been a commencement speaker at several colleges in the New England area, including Boston University (2008), New England School of Law (2008), Bryant University (2009), and Anna Maria College (2010). He has been awarded several honorary degrees, including from Boston University, Suffolk University, and Palomar College.

Lucchino is the only person known to have World Series rings (Orioles, 1983; Red Sox 2004, 2007, 2013 and 2018), a Super Bowl ring (Redskins, 1982) and a Final Four watch (Princeton, 1965). He was inducted to the Boston Red Sox Hall of Fame in 2016. He has also been inducted to the Pennsylvania Sports Hall of Fame, National Italian American Sports Hall of Fame, and Taylor Allderdice High School Hall of Fame. He was named chairman of The Jimmy Fund in 2016.

Lucchino is a non-Hodgkin lymphoma survivor. In December 2019, he underwent surgery at Brigham and Women's Hospital in Boston to remove a cancerous blockage in the kidney area.

He is married to Stacey Johnson, and he adopted her two children, Davis and Blair.

References

Further reading

External links
 Larry Lucchino: Keynote Address at Boston University's 135th Commencement Ceremony, on BUniverse, Boston University's video archive.
 Boston University School of Law Convocation 2017 - Larry Lucchino via YouTube
 Stand Up To Cancer Patient Story: Larry Lucchino via YouTube

1945 births
Living people
American chief executives of professional sports organizations
American men's basketball players
American people of Italian descent
Baltimore Orioles executives
Boston Red Sox executives
Businesspeople from Pittsburgh
Major League Baseball executives
Major League Baseball team presidents
Minor league baseball executives
Pawtucket Red Sox
Worcester Red Sox
Princeton Tigers men's basketball players
San Diego Padres executives
Taylor Allderdice High School alumni
Yale Law School alumni
Williams & Connolly people
Fenway Sports Group people